Joseph Jonathan Delisle (June 30, 1977 – March 16, 2006) was a Canadian professional ice hockey right winger.

Early life 
Delisle was born in Sainte-Anne-des-Plaines, Quebec. As a youth, he played in the 1991 Quebec International Pee-Wee Hockey Tournament with the Northern Selects minor ice hockey team.

Playing career

Delisle was drafted in the fourth round, 86th overall, of the 1995 NHL Entry Draft by the Montreal Canadiens. He played just one game in the National Hockey League with the Canadiens during the 1998–99 NHL season, going scoreless against the Ottawa Senators in 4:32 of ice time.

Death

He died in car accident in Beauce, Quebec on March 16, 2006.

See also
List of players who played only one game in the NHL

References

External links

Notice of death

1977 births
2006 deaths
Accidental deaths in Quebec
Bracknell Bees players
Canadian expatriate ice hockey players in England
Canadian expatriate ice hockey players in the United States
Canadian ice hockey right wingers
Fredericton Canadiens players
Hull Olympiques players
Ice hockey people from Quebec
Montreal Canadiens draft picks
Montreal Canadiens players
New Mexico Scorpions (CHL) players
People from Laurentides
Quebec Citadelles players
Road incident deaths in Canada
Verdun Collège Français players